Janma Rahasya is a 1972 Indian Kannada-language film directed by S. P. N. Krishna. The film stars Rajkumar and Bharathi.

Cast
 Rajkumar as Kumar
 Bharathi
 K. S. Ashwath
 Dinesh
 Dwarakish
 Vijayasree
 Niranjan
 Pandari Bai
 Keshava Murthy
 Advani Lakshmi Devi

Soundtrack
The music of the film was composed by M. Ranga Rao with lyrics for the soundtrack penned by R. N. Jayagopal and M. Narendra Babu.

Track list

External links
 
 Janma Rahasya songs

1972 films
1970s Kannada-language films
Films scored by M. Ranga Rao